James Wallace Butts Jr. (February 7, 1905 – December 17, 1973) was an American college football player, coach, and athletics administrator. He served as the head coach at the University of Georgia from 1939 to 1960, compiling a record of 140–86–9. His Georgia Bulldogs football teams won a national championship in 1942 and four Southeastern Conference titles (1942, 1946, 1948, 1959). Butts was also the athletic director at Georgia from 1939 to 1963. He was inducted posthumously into the College Football Hall of Fame as a coach in 1997.

Playing career
Butts was a 1929 graduate of Mercer University where he played college football under coach Bernie Moore, as well as baseball and basketball. He was an alumnus of Pi Kappa Phi fraternity.

Coaching career
Butts never failed to turn out an undefeated championship team at the three high schools he coached before arriving at the University of Georgia in 1938. He coached at Madison (Ga.) A&M from 1928–31; Georgia Military College in Milledgeville, 1932–34; and Male High in Louisville, 1935-37. Butts lost only ten games in ten years of high school coaching. Butts came to the University of Georgia as an assistant to Joel Hunt in 1938. Hunt left after a 5–4–1 season to take over at the University of Wyoming and Butts was elevated to the position of head coach, which he held for 22 seasons through 1960.

Butts' assistants in his first year as head coach were Bill Hartman, Howell Hollis, Quinton Lumpkin, Jules V. Sikes, Forrest Towns, and Jennings B. Whitworth. During his tenure as head coach, Georgia won its first consensus national championship in 1942 and claimed another national title in 1946. Ralph Jordan, future head football coach at Auburn University, joined the Georgia coaching staff in October 1946 as an assistant line coach. Butts was a proponent of the passing game in an era of "three yards and a cloud of dust". He developed innovative, intricate pass routes that were studied by other coaches. He was often called "the little round man" as he was five feet, six inches tall and had a squat body.

Butts coached 1942 Heisman Trophy winner Frank Sinkwich and 1946 Maxwell Award winner Charley Trippi. The 1942 Georgia team won the Rose Bowl over UCLA, finished #2 in the AP Poll, and was named a national championship by a number of selectors. Butts' teams also won four Southeastern Conference championships (1942, 1946, 1948 and 1959). As head coach, Butts posted a 140–86–9 record (.615 winning percentage), including a bowl record of 5–2–1.  Johnny Griffith, a former player and assistant coach to Butts, succeeded him as head coach from 1961-63.

Later life and honors

Butts resigned as UGA's head football coach in December 1960. He remained as athletic director until February 1963, when he resigned after a scandal erupted over a magazine article alleging corrupt practices, which Butts stridently denied.

In 1963, Butts filed a libel lawsuit against The Saturday Evening Post after it ran "The Story of a College Football Fix" in its March 23, 1963, issue alleging that he and Alabama head coach Bear Bryant had conspired to fix an upcoming Georgia-Alabama game. The University of Georgia and Georgia Attorney General Eugene Cook conducted separate investigations. Curtis Publishing Co. v. Butts, as it ultimately became when it reached the Supreme Court, was a landmark case that expanded the definition of "public figures" in libel cases. The court ruled in his favor in 1967, and The Saturday Evening Post was ordered to pay $3.06 million to the Butts family in damages, the largest settlement awarded at its time in history.

This settlement was seen as a contributing factor among many others in the demise of the venerable Saturday Evening Post six years later. Both Butts and Bryant had sued for $10 million each. Bryant settled for $300,000. In 1986, Professor James Kirby of the University of Tennessee School of Law published Fumble: Bear Bryant, Wally Butts and the Great College Football Scandal, which argued that the courts had made the wrong decision. Kirby had been the Southeastern Conference's official observer at the trial.

Butts was inducted into the Georgia Sports Hall of Fame in 1966 and posthumously into the College Football Hall of Fame in 1997. Butts-Mehre Heritage Hall, athletic administration offices and sports museum at the University of Georgia, was built in honor of Butts and his predecessor as coach, Harry Mehre.

After ending his football career, Butts established a credit insurance business in Athens and Atlanta, where he became very successful. Butts died of a heart attack after returning from a walk in 1973. He was buried in Oconee Hill Cemetery in Athens, Georgia.

Family
Butts was the son of James Wallace Butts Sr. (July 9, 1881 – January 2, 1959) and wife Annie (1881 – ?). Wally married Winifred Faye Taylor (July 12, 1907 – June 27, 1990) on February 19, 1929. They had three daughters, Faye, Jean and Nancy. Butts had numerous grandchildren and great grandchildren. Many members of the Butts family have gone on to support the University of Georgia in his honor.

Head coaching record

References

Further reading
 
 
 James Kirby, Fumble: Bear Bryant, Wally Butts and the Great College Football Scandal (New York: Harcourt, Brace, Jovanovich, 1986).
 Albert Figone, Cheating the Spread: Gamblers, Point Shaver, and Game Fixers in College Football and Basketball (University of Illinois Press, 2012).

External links
 
 

1905 births
1973 deaths
American football ends
Georgia Bulldogs and Lady Bulldogs athletic directors
Georgia Bulldogs football coaches
Mercer Bears football players
College Football Hall of Fame inductees
People from Milledgeville, Georgia
Coaches of American football from Georgia (U.S. state)
Players of American football from Georgia (U.S. state)